Sardar Vallabhbhai Patel Institute of Technology, Vasad, or SVIT, is a private technical institute located on the bank of the Mahi River, Gujarat, India. It offers undergraduate and graduate-level technical education. It also organizes many events like PRAKARSH (A National-level Technical Symposium), VISION (Inter-Departmental Tech-Fest), SPANDAN (Gujarat Technological University Fest) and AVISHKAR (A Project Exhibition).

Accreditation 
SVIT is approved by AICTE.

Education environment 

 PSCAD and ETAP software and a high voltage laboratory in the Electrical Engineering department. Highly featured computers and technology  for computer science and information and technology department.

The following table shows branch-wise intake in SVIT in alphabetical order, along with AICTE approval status as per 30 April 2015 release.

College of Architecture(COA)
College of Architecture, SVIT-Vasad was established by The New English School Trust (NEST), Vasad in 2000. College of Architecture is approved by Council of Architecture,  Delhi. Initially it was affiliated to Gujarat University, Ahmedabad and from  2016 it is affiliated to Sardar Patel University, Vallabh Vidyanagar. It is one of the reputed Architectural colleges of the state known for its high quality of pedagogy.

As our college is part of the Sardar Vallabhbhai Patel Institute of Technology campus which offers degree courses in about eight different disciplines, we are uniquely  poised to present a special multi-disciplinary exposure to our students. Architecture and Interior Design has always been a creative, open-minded profession with an affinity for logic,  reasoning and planning. Our course helps the students understand the continuity  of concerns in the realm in architecture from the conception to design, development  and construction including post-occupancy studies and conservation.The college continuously  promotes co-curricular activities like construction site visits, Educational tours  in India and abroad, Relative study programme, sports, cultural programs etc. Students  are offered many value addition programs. Training programs for software like  AutoCAD, Revit, 3d Max, Corel draw, Photoshop, Power point, and other graphic  software widely used in the field of architecture are also arranged for students.  Programs on personality development are also conducted for students. Students  also participate in activities like debates, juries, quizzes, film club.

Our college offers four courses:

 D. VOC (Architectural Assistantship) (3yrs)
 B. ID (Bachelor of Interior Design) (4yrs)
 B.Arch (Bachelor of Architecture) (5yrs)
 M.Arch (Masters of Architecture) (2yrs)

These courses revolve around the studio programs that are well equipped with experienced core faculties and regular – visiting academicians and professionals, each proficient in their area of the expertise.

1. D. VOC (Architectural Assistantship)

The course follows a module of 3 days academic Teaching & 3 days Practical Training Under Practicing Architects.

2. B. ID (Bachelor of Interior Design)

This course encourages Students to develop an understanding of the design development process and research methods relevant to Interior Design practise.

3. B.Arch (Bachelor of Architecture)

This course combines theory and practice and equips students to gain knowledge in the planning, designing and construction of different kinds of physical structures. The five-year degree programme has two stages: the Foundation Stage and the Specialization Stage.

4. M.Arch (Masters of Architecture)

This course is a rigorous and comprehensive program, preparing graduates for the full range of professional activities in the field of architecture. The course responds to the increasing competition in the professional procurement of building and the growing demand for specialist knowledge & skills in the pursuit of architectural excellence.

OUR STRENGTH 

PRINCIPAL

Prof. Sailesh G. Nair (Exp. 22 yrs)

REGULAR FACULTIES CORE MEMBERS

Prof. Pragnesh Shah (Exp. 21 yrs)

Prof. Ashwin Mukul (Exp. 25 yrs) 

Asso. Prof. Pallavi Mahida (Exp. 20 yrs)

Asso. Prof. Pallavi Abhale (Exp. 14 yrs) 

Asso. Prof. Vignya Shah (Exp. 9 yrs)

Asst. Prof. Rohini Kachroo (Exp. 6 yrs)

Asst. Prof. Ronak Patel (Exp. 9 yrs)

Asst. Prof. Shailesh Patel (Exp. 6 yrs)

Asst. Prof. Taha Padrawala (Exp. 7 yrs)

Asst. Prof. Mitali Bhatt (Exp. 4 yrs)

Asst. Prof. Praveen Suthar (Exp. 5 yrs)

Asst. Prof. Esha Dalal (Exp. 6 yrs)

Asst. Prof. Jaishree Mishra (Exp. 3 yrs)

Asst. Prof. Dhwani Bhavsar (Exp. 2 yrs)

Asst. Prof. Darshini Jain (Exp. 5 yrs)

Asst. Prof. Sampath Raju (Exp. 3 yrs)

ALLIED FACULTIES CORE MEMBERS

Asso. Prof. Dinesh Shah (STRUCTURE) (Exp. 20 yrs)

Asso. Prof. Amit Shah (STRUCTURE) (Exp. 32 yrs)

TENURE FACULTIES MEMBERS

Asso. Prof. Swara Shah (Exp. 13 yrs)

Asst.  Prof. Ketan Shah (Exp. 27 yrs)

Asst.  Prof. Jwalant Shah (Exp. 3 yrs)

Asst. Prof. Apexa Savlia (Exp. 5 yrs)

Asst.  Prof. Prasant Rami (Exp. 6 yrs)

Asst.  Prof. Taniya Patel (Exp. 3 yrs)

Asst.  Prof. Palav Desai (Exp. 2 yrs)

Asst.  Prof. Namrata Vyas (Exp. 9 yrs)

ALLIED FACULTIES TENURE MEMBERS

Asst. Prof. Santa Rakshit (Exp. 17 yrs)

Asst. Prof. Navin Shankar (Exp. 15 yrs)

B.ID FACULTIES MEMBERS

Asst. Prof. Rachna Gala (Exp. 5 yrs)

Asst. Prof. Sushma Vanjani (Exp. 4 yrs)

Asst. Prof. Athira Nair (Exp. 1 yr)

M.ARCH FACULTIES MEMBERS

Prof. Preety Shah (Exp. 33 yrs)

Asso. Prof. Purvi Oza (Exp. 13 yrs)

Asst. Prof. Urvish Bhatt (Exp. 7 yrs)

Asst. Prof. Satish Vaghela (Exp. 2 yrs)

SUPPORTING STAFF

Mr.Rajendra Patel, Mr. Ankit Patel, Mr. Sandip Patel,

Mr. Pratik Patel, Mr. Yash Patel, Mr. Pravin Patel,

Mr. Paresh Zala, Mr. Narendra Prajapati, 

Mr. Mihr Patel, Mr. Hemang Patel

for more update visit our website www.svitvasad.ac.in

References

External links 

 

Universities and colleges in Gujarat
Engineering colleges in Gujarat
All India Council for Technical Education
Gujarat University
1997 establishments in Gujarat
Educational institutions established in 1997